The Iowa State Cyclones women's soccer team represents Iowa State University (ISU) and competes in the Big 12 Conference of NCAA Division I. The team is coached by  Matt Fannon, who enters his second season at Iowa State in 2021.  The Cyclones host their home games at the Cyclone Soccer Complex on Iowa State's campus.

Current roster
as of 2020

History
Iowa State put together a varsity squad then they joined the Big 12 in 1996.  Their best season yet has been the 2005 squad.  Head Coach Rebecca Hornhacher earned Big 12 Coach of the Year honors en route to their first and only invitation to the NCAA Tournament.

The current Head Coach is Matt Fannon, who joined Iowa State from Bowling Green in December 2019.

Record

Individual awards

All-Big 12 First Team

All-Big 12 Second Team

Big 12 Coach of the Year

Facilities
The $13 million Cyclone Sports Complex, the home of Iowa State track and field, soccer and softball opened in the fall of 2012.

The facility brings numerous new amenities for the Cyclones and their fans.  On-site restrooms, a concession stand, home and away locker rooms, officials' locker rooms, team meeting rooms, an athletic training room, a press box, bleachers and a scoreboard are among the new features that make it a state-of-the-art facility. The soccer facility has a seating capacity of 1,500.

References

NCAA Division I women's soccer teams
Soccer, Women's
Soccer clubs in Iowa
1996 establishments in Iowa
Association football clubs established in 1996
Big 12 Conference women's soccer